Leeds Midland Road depot is a locomotive and rolling stock maintenance facility located in Leeds, West Yorkshire, England. The site is located a few miles to the south-west of Leeds station on the line between Leeds and Castleford. Owned and operated by Freightliner, it is the heavy maintenance facility for its diesel and electric locomotives and wagon fleet.

History
Leeds Midland Road depot was opened in 2003 by London & North Western Railway (LNWR) as a maintenance facility to maintain the Freightliner Class 66 fleet under a ten-year contract. and was located on the former Balm Road sidings that had been used to offload quarry products. LNWR were contracted to maintain up to 30 class 66 locomotives that worked in the Yorkshire area at the site, with heavier maintenance being carried out by Electro-Motive. In 2006, Freightliner Maintenance Limited (FML) was formed and assumed control of operations at Leeds. FML is a subsidiary of the Freightliner Group and was instituted when the number of locomotives and wagons the company leased or owned increased with an upsurge in traffic. Besides being a central point for maintaining the class 66 and Class 70 fleets, both classes are based from here and the facility undertakes wagon maintenance.

The site has a total of nine roads; the shed has two covered roads that have pits beneath them to allow access to the underside of wagons and locomotives, whilst the fuelling point also has two roads, but only one of these is covered. Outside of these, there are a further five roads for storage and maintenance. A  crane spans roads 3 and 4 to allow for wheelset changes on locomotives and wagons.

Locomotives on routine maintenance find their way to Midland Road by hauling scheduled services. Besides the container trains passing through Stourton to the south, many Heavy Haul trains run past the depot too, which makes switching locomotives easy and cost-effective.

With the downturn in tonnages of coal moved by railfreight in the United Kingdom, several examples of Class 70 locomotives have been stored on the non-maintenance sidings that border the running lines to the south.

In November 2017, Freightliner opened up a new maintenance facility at Crewe Basford Hall that has taken on some of the work previously undertaken at Leeds Midland Road, particularly the electric locomotives as there is no overhead wire access into Midland Road. The heavier maintenance work will still be carried at Leeds though.

The site is under threat from the High Speed 2 (HS2) project into central Leeds. The draft environmental statement for the West Midlands to Leeds arm of the HS2 line states that

Notes

References

Sources

External links

Video of the site

Railway depots in Yorkshire
Rail transport in West Yorkshire
Transport infrastructure completed in 2003
Buildings and structures in Leeds